"Hungry Like the Wolf" is a song by English new wave band Duran Duran. Written by the band members, the song was produced by Colin Thurston for the group's second studio album Rio (1982). The song was released on 4 May 1982 as the band's fifth single in the United Kingdom. It reached No. 5 on the UK Singles Chart, and received a gold certification by the British Phonographic Industry (BPI).

The music video for "Hungry Like the Wolf" was directed by Russell Mulcahy and filmed in the jungles of Sri Lanka. Although the band initially failed to break into the US market, MTV placed the "Hungry Like the Wolf" video into heavy rotation. Subsequently, the group gained much exposure; the song peaked at the number 3 spot on the Billboard Hot 100 in March 1983, and Duran Duran became an international sensation. The video won the first Grammy Award for Best Short Form Music Video in 1984.

Writing and recording

"Hungry Like the Wolf" was written and recorded on a Saturday in the spring of 1982 at the basement studios of EMI's London headquarters. The song was built throughout the day as each band member arrived, and by the evening it was essentially complete.

"That track came from fiddling with the new technology that was starting to come in", guitarist Andy Taylor said in an interview with Blender magazine.

Rhodes came up with an idea for the backing track in the car while he was going to the studio. He started playing with the Roland Jupiter-8 keyboard, while lead vocalist Simon Le Bon was working with the lyrics. The lyrics were inspired by Little Red Riding Hood, and the repeating of the word "do" at the end of each verse takes its melody from the instrumentals in Gordon Lightfoot's song "If You Could Read My Mind". Andy Taylor worked out a Marc Bolan-ish guitar part, a very Marshall-sounding Les Paul guitar lick that was added to the track. Then the bass and drums were added, and the whole track was finished that day, including Le Bon's vocal melody and lyrics. The laugh at the beginning of the song and the moans during the song's fade-out were performed and recorded live by Rhodes' girlfriend at the time.

The group re-recorded the song for the Rio album a few months later at London's AIR Studios with producer Colin Thurston, who also recorded the hits "Too Shy" for Kajagoogoo, and "I Want Candy" for Bow Wow Wow. Andy Taylor remembers: "He was a great organizer and arranger, we gave him far more ideas and music than the track actually needed, and he was important in the process of whittling them down to the essential elements." Thurston and the band decided to keep the demo's original electronic backing track and just re-record the other instruments and vocals.

John Taylor has stated that he "(doesn't) really know" what the lyrics mean, speculating that the song is probably about "meeting girls" and/or "wanting to have sex with someone".

Critical reception
Rob Mitchum of Pitchfork Media in a 2003 review of the Singles Box Set 1981–1985, said that "singles don't come much stronger than 'Hungry Like the Wolf'," praising its "bubbly keys around a slashing guitar riff," adding that the song "show[s] off how Duran Duran was a band, not just a synthesizer." Jon Pareles from The New York Times, said the song "put an oblique, sometimes apocalyptic spin on pop romance in the verses but kept the choruses clear and catchy, never disguising their pop intentions," adding that the "posing was always a little preposterous, but no less enjoyable for that."
 
AllMusic's Ned Raggett said the song "blended a tight, guitar-heavy groove with electronic production and a series of instant hooks," adding that it was one of Rio'''s "biggest smashes" that "open[ed] the door in America for the New Romantic/synth rock crossover." Stewart Mason, also from AllMusic, called "Hungry Like the Wolf" a "spectacular pop single", and "the finest song Duran Duran ever wrote", adding that it was a "much more kinetic and exciting song than earlier flop singles like 'Planet Earth'."

In 2006, VH1 ranked "Hungry Like the Wolf" No. 3 on its list of the "100 Greatest Songs of the 80's". In 2021, Rolling Stone listed the song at number 398 on "The 500 Greatest Songs of All Time".

Music video

In 1982, music video director Russell Mulcahy, who had directed the band's first video "Planet Earth," was brought back to make the music video for "Hungry Like the Wolf" and two other songs for the band's 1983 video album. The band had a vision of jungles and exotic women, and Mulcahy suggested Sri Lanka, a country he had just visited. EMI spent $200,000 to send the group to Sri Lanka; the band made a stopover there in April, en route to a scheduled Australian tour. Keyboardist Nick Rhodes and guitarist Andy Taylor remained behind to finish the mixing of the Rio album while the rest of the band began filming the video; they flew straight to Sri Lanka after handing over the final masters to EMI.

As it was described in the pop culture book, The 1980s, the video was lush and cinematic, with shots of jungles, rivers, elephants, cafes and marketplaces evoking the atmosphere of the film Raiders of the Lost Ark (1981). Andy Taylor, who contracted a stomach virus serious enough to require hospitalisation from accidentally drinking water in the lagoon during the shoot, describes the storyline as "Indiana Jones is horny and wants to get laid." In the video, lead vocalist Simon Le Bon's head rises in slow motion out of the river as rain pours down, evoking a scene in Apocalypse Now (1979). He then chases a beautiful tiger-like woman played by Bermudian model Sheila Ming, from open markets in the city through obstacles in the jungle. During the chase, Le Bon has his face mopped by a young boy and overturns a bar room table, culminating in a final chase and struggle in a jungle clearing, which is sexually suggestive. In the meantime, the other band members hunt for Le Bon.

Less than 2 months after the shoot of the video, the American cable television network MTV put "Hungry Like the Wolf" into heavy rotation, playing it four times a day. The exposure eventually helped propel the single into the top 5 of the Billboard Hot 100, and the Rio album into the top 10 of the albums chart. Les Garland, senior executive vice-president of MTV, said: "I remember our director of talent and artist relations came running in and said, 'You have got to see this video that's come in.' Duran Duran were getting zero radio airplay at the time, and MTV wanted to try to break new music. 'Hungry Like the Wolf' was the greatest video I'd ever seen." MTV named "Hungry Like the Wolf" the 15th most-played video of the network, and was 11th on the century-end MTV "100 Greatest Videos Ever Made". "Hungry Like the Wolf" won the Grammy Award for Best Short Form Music Video at the 26th Grammy Awards in February 1984, making it the first video to ever win that award. In 2001, VH1 rated it 31st on the "VH1: 100 Greatest Videos".

Chart performance
"Hungry Like the Wolf" was released in the United Kingdom on 4 May 1982; the next week the song debuted at number 35 on the UK Singles Chart, 6 weeks later it reached its peak at number 5, remaining 6 weeks in the top 10, and 12 weeks in total. The release of the single helped the band's studio album Rio reach the 2nd position of the albums chart. In Ireland the single entered the chart on 23 May 1982; reaching the number 4 position on the Irish Singles Chart, becoming the band's first top 10 hit in that country. Despite achieving commercial success with several top hits in the United Kingdom, the band failed to enter in the US market. Their debut studio album did not chart and failed to yield a hit single. "Hungry Like the Wolf" was released in the United States on 7 June 1982 but did not chart. At first, US radio were reluctant to play the song, but influential stations such as KROQ in Los Angeles championed the band, hosting an in-person artist album signing at a Licorice Pizza in Canoga Park, Calif., to build support for the act. On the first day of WLIR in Garden City, N.Y.'s run as a Modern Rock station, "Hungry Like the Wolf" aired in morning drive, with John DeBella as host. It gained national popularity, however, only when the newly emerging MTV began playing the accompanying music video in heavy rotation, the exposure pushed "Hungry Like the Wolf" onto AOR playlists. The song entered Billboard's Hot Mainstream Rock Tracks chart in August 1982 and reached the top of the chart in January 1983.

Following the release of the Carnival EP in September and the David Kershenbaum remaster of Rio in November, the Kershenbaum remix of "Hungry Like the Wolf" was released as a single on 3 December 1982. "Hungry Like the Wolf" entered the Billboard Hot 100 on 25 December 1982 at number 77, peaking at number 3 on 26 March 1983, and remaining 23 weeks on the chart. 10 years later in March 1993, the single was certified gold by the Recording Industry Association of America (RIAA). In Canada, the song debuted at number 48 on the RPM'' singles chart on 22 January 1983, reaching the top of the chart for 1 week on 19 March 1983, staying on the chart for 19 weeks and ending at the 10th position of the 1983 year-end chart. It was certified gold by the Canadian Recording Industry Association (CRIA) in April 1983.

Legacy
"Hungry Like the Wolf" remains one of Duran Duran's most popular songs and a fan favourite. As of October 2021 it was the band's most streamed song in the UK with 40,4 million streams.

Formats and track listings

7": EMI. / EMI 5295 United Kingdom 
 "Hungry Like the Wolf" (Single Version) – 3:27
 "Careless Memories" (Live) – 4:11 (Recorded live at Hammersmith Odeon, London, 17 December 1981)

12": EMI. / 12 EMI 5295 United Kingdom 
 "Hungry Like the Wolf" (Night Version) – 5:14
 "Careless Memories" (Live) – 4:11 (Recorded live at Hammersmith Odeon, London, 17 December 1981)

7": Harvest. / B 5134 United States 
 "Hungry Like the Wolf" (130 B.P.M. Single Version) – 3:23
 "Careless Memories" (Live) – 4:11 (Recorded live at Hammersmith Odeon, London, 17 December 1981)
 Initial US release.

7": Harvest. / B 5195 United States 
 "Hungry Like the Wolf" (Night Version) – 5:14 
 "Hungry Like the Wolf" (US Album Remix) – 4:11
 US re-release.
 Track 2 is remixed by David Kershenbaum.

CD: Part of Singles Box Set 1981–1985 
 "Hungry Like the Wolf" (Single Version) – 3:27
 "Careless Memories" (Live) – 4:11 (Recorded live at Hammersmith Odeon, London, 17 December 1981)
 "Hungry Like the Wolf" (129 B.P.M. Night Version) – 5:09

CD: Part of Rio 2009 Limited Edition (CD1) 
 "Hungry Like the Wolf" (US Album Remix) – 4:11

CD: Part of Rio 2009 Limited Edition (CD2) 
 "Hungry Like the Wolf" (129 B.P.M. Night Version) – 5:09

Personnel
Simon Le Bon – lead vocals
Nick Rhodes – keyboards 
John Taylor – bass guitar, background vocals 
Roger Taylor – drums, percussion 
Andy Taylor – lead guitar, background vocals 
Colin Thurston – producer and engineer
David Kershenbaum – remixing

Charts

Weekly charts

Year-end charts

Certifications

Notes

References

External links

1982 songs
1982 singles
Duran Duran songs
Grammy Award for Best Short Form Music Video
Music videos directed by Russell Mulcahy
RPM Top Singles number-one singles
Song recordings produced by Colin Thurston
EMI Records singles
Harvest Records singles
Capitol Records singles
Songs about wolves
Songs written by Simon Le Bon
Songs written by John Taylor (bass guitarist)
Songs written by Roger Taylor (Duran Duran drummer)
Songs written by Andy Taylor (guitarist)
Songs written by Nick Rhodes